Stephen D. Richards or Samuel D. Richards (March 18, 1856April 26, 1879), also known in the media as The Nebraska Fiend, Kearney County Murderer, and The Ohio Monster, was an American serial killer who confessed to committing a total of nine murders in Nebraska and Iowa between 1876 and 1878. 

Richards was born in West Virginia (then part of Virginia) in 1856. His family would later move to Ohio, eventually settling in the Quaker village of Mount Pleasant. In 1876, Richards left his home and headed westward with the intention of seeking his fortune. For a time, he found work at a local asylum; he claimed that during his time there, he lost all empathy for other people. When Richards later confessed to his crimes, he claimed to have committed his first murder sometime in late 1876, two weeks after arriving in Kearney, Nebraska. He would go on to commit several other murders, which he later claimed were done in self-defense. Richards fled after murdering Mary L. Harlson and her three children, but was captured in Mount Pleasant. In 1879, he was convicted of the murders of the Harlson family, as well as the killing of neighbor Peter Anderson, and hanged.

Richards was regarded as handsome and charismatic by contemporary chroniclers, who noted that his appearance and behavior completely obscured his nature as a cold-blooded killer. Many observed that he displayed a complete lack of remorse for his crimes and indifference toward his execution. Modern-day forensic psychologist Katherine Ramsland has noted that these characteristics were also displayed by serial killer Ted Bundy, and she has referred to Richards as The Old West's Ted Bundy.

The nature of Richards' crimes and his behavior after his capture led to a brief period of notoriety, as Richards was widely talked about in the media at the time. Richards has been featured in a handful of books and periodicals, including a posthumous biography, based on an interview conducted after his final arrest. The biography, which also included entries on other criminals of the time, was published in 1879 by the Nebraska State Journal. In modern times he is noted as Nebraska's first documented serial killer in Nebraska and the first person to be executed by the state.

Early and young adult life
Stephen D. Richards was born in Wheeling, West Virginia, on March 18, 1856. He was said to have had five sisters and a brother. When Richards was six, his family relocated to Ohio; first to Monroe County, and then to Noble County. The family later settled in the Quaker village of Mount Pleasant in Ohio when he was eleven. Richards would later describe his mother as a devout Methodist, and his father, a farmer, as having "made no profession of religion". Richards attended school in Mount Pleasant; he claimed that the teachers considered him well behaved. At his mother's insistence, he also attended Sunday school and church regularly.

Up until the age of twenty, Richards lived with his parents, working for farmers and other locals in the area. On September 16, 1871, Richards' mother died of an unknown cause. Several years later, at the age of 20, Richards met and became engaged to a young woman named Anna Millhorne, with whom he regularly corresponded during his later travels, up until his final arrest. Richards also met men whom he would describe as being of "questionable occupation"; he began passing counterfeit bills which he claimed he had obtained by way of a man in New York. In February 1876, he left Mount Pleasant, heading west to find fame and fortune.

For a short time, Richards lived in Iowa, working as a hand at farms in Burlington and Morning Sun. He was later hired as an attendant at the Iowa Lunatic Asylum in Mount Pleasant, Iowa; his job was to bury deceased patients. The New York Times reported that Richards' time working at the asylum was a significant event in his life that shaped his own humanity and his view of the human race. While Richards would deny witnessing any abuse of the asylum's patients, later reflecting that during his tenure of handling and disposing of deceased patients, he became accustomed to such an extent he came to have little to no regard for humanity.

Richards left the asylum in October of 1876, and began drifting around the Midwest, finding intermittent work and occasionally consorting with train robbers. He stayed in Kansas City briefly before moving on to Nebraska, where he passed through Hastings before arriving in Kearney, residing there for a period of two to three weeks before leaving for Cheyenne County. During his stay Richards claimed to have had a part in a number of gunfights, resulting in him shooting each individual, although he admitted to being unaware of their condition after each shooting and whether or not they were killed in the resulting gunfight. During this period of time, Richards went under the alias William Hudson, one of many false names he would use during the span of his life. Richards would later discard this alias once he reached Kansas City.

Murders

Early murders
In a confession written after his final arrest, Richards admitted to having killed four men during his travels around Nebraska and Iowa in 1876 and 1877. He claimed to have committed his first murder sometime in late 1876, two weeks after arriving in Kearney.

According to Richards, he met a man while traveling on horseback through the Nebraska countryside, and the pair decided to camp for the night near Dobytown. (Several newspapers reported that the two men's campsite was instead near Sand Hills.) Settling down for the night, the two began gambling in a game of cards, with Richards winning most of the stranger's money. As the two set off for Kearney the following morning, the other man turned on Richards and demanded his money back. Richards refused, whereupon, he claimed, the other man became belligerent. Richards then shot him above the left eye, killing him instantly. After confirming the man was dead, Richards disposed of his body in the Platte River.

Several days later, as he continued his trek to Kearney, Richards encountered another man fifteen miles from an area called Walker's Ranch, who was traveling on foot. The man had seen Richards and the previous traveler together, and the stranger asked what had become of that man. While talking to him, Richards realized that this man and the man whom Richards had killed were friends and business partners. Richards denied any knowledge of the dead man, but his friend continued to hound Richards with questions, which caused Richards to become increasingly anxious. Believing the man knew too much, Richards decided to kill the stranger in order to prevent him from disclosing to anyone else his knowledge of the association between Richards and his murder victim. Richards would later say that when the stranger turned his back, he shot him in the back of the head, killing him. He disposed of the corpse and sold the man's horse in a nearby town. He then continued on his way, but before reaching Kearney, stopped at the home of Jasper Harlson, who, according to Richards, was a train robber of some repute. Mary, Jasper's wife, whom Richards described as being a "free talker", noticed that Richards' shirt was stained with blood, and commented on it. Richards had not noticed blood on his clothes, and claimed to have replied, as if in jest, that it must have come from the men he had murdered. That ended the conversation.

Richards later traveled to Cedar Rapids, Iowa, where he used counterfeit money to purchase a horse and buggy from an unidentified man. After Richards left, the seller soon discovered the bills were not genuine. Tracking Richards down, the seller demanded that Richards give him real money or return his horse and buggy. With Richards refusing both demands, the man threatened to have him arrested, and Richards responded by shooting him. He then buried the body and left the area.

In March 1877, Richards and a young man with the surname Gemge left Grand Island, Nebraska, on horseback and headed towards Kearney. As they neared their destination, they stopped and camped for the night between Lowell and Kearney, along the Platte River. Richards woke up at about 3:00a.m. and roused his partner, telling him it was nearly morning and they should get back on the road. Gemge, infuriated at being awakened so early, began arguing with Richards about the time, and then started insulting him. The argument continued, as Richards later recounted:

 
After leaving the area, Richards arrived at Kearney, registering under the alias F.A. Hoge at the local hotel. During his stay, Richards reunited with several old acquaintances George "Dutch Henry" Johnson, and his companion Hurst, as well as a man who went by the name Mr. Burns. On March 21, Richards was arrested along with Burns, whom he had been spending most of his time with. At the time, both men were not told as to the reason for their arrest, although Richards came to suspect that it was for the murder of Gemge. It was only later that they were notified by the authorities that they were under suspicion for murder of a man named Peter Geteway, whom Richards claimed his innocence over. Although Richards was soon acquitted, Burns was held in custody because of a testimony of a "sporting lady" whom he had previously been acquainted with. Burns would also be acquitted some time later after no evidence was found linking him to the crime.

Murders of the Harlson family

In June 1878, while in Kearney, Richards was arrested and jailed for larceny. He would later claim that this charge was unfounded. During his time in jail, he reunited with Mary L. Harlson. Shortly before Richards' arrival, she had been arrested under suspicion of having aided the escape of her husband and another prisoner, named Underwood or Nixon, from the Kearney jail. Richards and Mary Harlson agreed that she would sell him the deed to her property six months later, for $600.

After Richards was released from jail, he traveled around Nebraska for several months. He did business in Hastings, Bloomington, and Grand Island before arriving at the Harlsons' Kearney County homestead on October 18, 1878. Mary Harlson transferred the property to Richards upon his arrival, and he stayed there for several weeks. The New York Daily Herald later reported that Richards had married Harlson on November 2, in what the newspaper alleged was a scam to acquire ownership of Harlson's land. A month later, Richards decided to kill Harlson and her three children—ten-year-old Daisy, four-year-old Mabel, and two-year-old Jasper, nicknamed "Jesse". In his confession, Richards claimed that Harlson had discovered that he was guilty of murder, and he feared that her talkative nature might betray his presence to the authorities. In order to silence Harlson, and ensure that his previous crimes would remain hidden, Richards resolved to murder the entire family.

On November 3, 1878, Richards got up early in the morning, along with another man named Brown, who had been staying at the house. Brown left to feed the horses and complete other chores around the farm. Richards found a spade and dug a hole, then sneaked back into the house and murdered Mary, Daisy, Mabel, and Jesse with an ax. According to one report, Mary and one of the children were murdered with a smoothing iron, while the other two were physically assaulted. Richards would refute this claim, saying he had killed the family while they were asleep. He said most of them had died after the first several blows, with the exception of Daisy, who had "writhed in pain for some time". Richards was said to have scrubbed the blood off of the floor and himself after the murders, before calmly sitting down to breakfast. After he had eaten, he carried the bodies out of the house and buried them in the hole he had dug nearby. When later questioned about the Harlsons' disappearance, Richards told several people the family had left with Brown, and he did not know when they would return. A 21st-century account claims that Richards said Harlson had transferred the deed of the farm to him, and subsequently left with her children, to reunite with her husband. The bodies of Harlson and her children were discovered on December 11. Some reports said they had been concealed underneath a haystack, rather than buried, as Richards would later claim.

Murder of Peter Anderson
On December 9, 1878, Richards agreed to help his neighbor, a 26-year-old immigrant from Sweden named Peter Anderson, with some work on Anderson's property. The Columbus Journal would later report that Richards had used the alias "Dick Richardson" when working for Anderson. On December 9, Anderson became ill after eating a meal Richards had prepared, causing him to suspect Richards had poisoned him. Anderson informed a neighbor of his suspicions. The next day, he confronted Richards; the two fought, and Richards either beat Anderson to death with a hammer or hatchet, or shot him (contemporary newspaper accounts vary). Anderson's body was later discovered in the cellar of his house, buried underneath a pile of coal. Richards would deny poisoning Anderson, saying that was not his style. He claimed Anderson had attacked him with a knife and that he killed Anderson in self-defense. Anderson was later buried at the Bethany Cemetery in Axtell, Nebraska.

On the run
Richards decided to flee Kearney shortly after murdering Anderson, expecting that the bodies he had concealed would soon be discovered. In the evening, as he was hitching up Anderson's horses and preparing to leave, some of Anderson's neighbors arrived. They had noticed Anderson's absence and questioned Richards about it. He reportedly told them Anderson was inside the house. As Anderson's neighbors entered the dwelling, Richards fled on horseback, and rode to Bloomington. He traveled east, by horse and train and on foot, passing through Omaha and Chicago. While on the run, he met up with Jasper Harlson and Harlson's fellow escaped prisoner. The three traveled through Wheeling, West Virginia, and into Ohio, passing through Bridgeport, before arriving in Richards' hometown of Mount Pleasant. Nebraska Governor Silas Garber issued an arrest warrant for Richards on December 16, 1878, and promised a reward of $200 for his arrest and conviction.

Capture
Most accounts state that on December 20, 1878, shortly after Richards had arrived in Mount Pleasant, he attended a ballroom dance, accompanied by two unidentified women. Copies of a wanted poster featuring Richards had been circulated throughout the town recently, and a constable named McGrew recognized him from the poster. He enlisted the help of a penitentiary guard named Folge; the two men armed themselves with shotguns and set off after Richards. They found him walking through a field just outside of town with the two women. He was unarmed and quickly surrendered. Richards would later claim that he had spotted the officers approaching him; intending to fight his way out of the situation, he told the women to head back to town. They refused, however, so Richards chose to surrender. He said that if the women had left, he would have avoided arrest:

Richards said that if he had escaped, he would have returned to Nebraska. He reasoned that it would have been the last place anyone would look for him. 

Some accounts differed about the date and place of Richards' arrest. The Wheeling Daily Intelligencer said that, upon arriving in a town near Mount Pleasant, Richards was identified by a former acquaintance, who detained him with the help of another person. One source claims that Richards was arrested in early 1879 in Austin, Texas. One modern-day account would report that Richards, whom they listed under the name Samuel Richards, had been identified and captured by Pinkerton agents. There were even conflicting descriptions of Richards' appearance. Newspapers described him as being approximately six feet two inches tall and "heavily built", with dark hair and blue eyes. However, the account of a Dr. Moreland, who performed a phrenological examination of Richards before his execution, conflicted with these descriptions of him. In his examination report, Moreland said Richards had light brown hair and dark gray eyes. At his execution, one spectator later described Richards as having steel grey eyes that were almost bluish in color and dark brown hair.

The Workingman's Friend, a Leavenworth, Kansas newspaper, reported that Chicago authorities received part of the reward. 

After his arrest, Richards was jailed in Steubenville, Ohio. While there, he wrote two articles for the local newspaper, confessing to nine murders in a period of three years. Sheriff David Anderson of Buffalo County, Nebraska, and Sheriff Martin of Kearney County, both of whom had pursued Richards to Ohio, returned him to Nebraska. Due to local public outrage, Anderson and Martin feared that Richards would be lynched if he were returned to any of the localities where he had committed his crimes, so it was decided to avoid taking him to these places initially. 

At the time of Richards' arrest, authorities suspected he was a member of a gang of outlaws who had plagued the state, or even the group's leader. Law enforcement was able to definitively link Richards to the nine murders to which he had confessed, and suggested that he might have killed even more, but The Nebraska State Journal doubted this. 

Shortly before his trial, Richards predicted that he would be convicted and hanged for his crimes. He was moved to a jail in Omaha on December 28, then transferred to Kearney by train. On December 30, a large crowd of enraged townsfolk gathered outside of the jail in Kearney where Richards was being kept. Fearing a lynching, authorities took "extra precautions" to ensure Richards' safety, as well as their own. While being moved to the depot, Richards was said to have been impressed by the large crowd, asking whether the whole town was there to see him. Eventually, the crowd dispersed and there were no further incidents during the rest of his stay in Kearney.

Trial
Richards' trial began on January 16, 1879, in Minden, Nebraska, with Judge William Gaslin presiding. The prosecution was led by a district attorney named Scofield, and Richards' defense was led by a lawyer named Savage. Scofield laid out two indictments for murder in the first degree, for the killings of the Harlson family and Anderson. Richards pled not guilty, arguing that Anderson's killing was in self-defense, and therefore justifiable. The prosecution called seven witnesses to the stand. They all testified to the state in which Anderson was found. Richards then was called to testify. When questioned by Scofield, he admitted to killing Anderson with a hammer after a heated argument but reiterated that he had done so in self-defense. Richards said that, although repeatedly warned not to do so, Anderson had reached for a nearby hatchet. The prosecution then entered into evidence the hammer that had been used to kill Anderson. Richards identified it as the murder weapon. 

After two hours of deliberation, the jury found Richards guilty of the murders of the Harlsons and Anderson. He was sentenced to death by hanging, and his execution date was set for April 26, 1879. Richards was described as being "cheerful and indifferent" to both the proceedings and his conviction. The Sedalia Weekly Bazoo reported that, shortly after his conviction, Richards managed to smuggle a knife into his cell, with the intention of using it to kill himself, but the weapon was discovered by the authorities, and confiscated before he could use it. No other newspaper records corroborate this story, however.

Execution

When Richards was returned to Nebraska, the Omaha Herald reported that he "manifested supreme indifference to his lot, was perfectly willing to be brought direct to Kearney Junction and said he had as soon died one way as another." Shortly after Richards' conviction, Sheriff Martin announced that his execution in Minden would be open to the public, even though Martin feared the attendance of a large number of spectators who could become violent. In an effort to prevent a riot, an enclosure was constructed around the gallows to separate the expected crowd from Richards. However, tickets that allowed admittance into the restricted area were sold. Also, Richards was allowed to invite people; he chose members of the press whom he had befriended while in prison. One such ticket of admittance was recently discovered and is now in the collection of the Nebraska Historical Society.

Spectators at the execution were said to have numbered between 2,000 and 25,000. As the crowd became increasingly agitated, the authorities pleaded with them to stay outside the enclosure, but guards were unable to prevent the spectators from beginning to destroy the barrier. One participant in the incident, a man named Rolf Johnson, recalled that twenty to thirty people in the crowd cut the rope as the authorities tried to stop the agitated crowd. The mob then proceeded to pull the posts out of the ground, attempting to drag the makeshift barrier away while the guards were pulling the rope at the other end in what Johnson described as a "tug of war". The mob would succeed in pulling the rope away from the guards, dragging it onto the prairie before proceeding to destroy the barrier completely, in spite of the authorities' attempts to intervene. At precisely 1:00p.m., Richards was led to the gallows by Martin and his deputy; this pacified the crowd. Upon ascending the gallows, Richards launched into an impassioned defense of his actions. He again claimed that the killing of Anderson was in self-defense, and also disavowed any involvement in the murders of the Harlson family, and claimed he was the victim of a "wrongful conviction". He then said he had found the Lord, "made [his] peace with God", and "had faith in Christ", and asked the crowd to join him in singing the hymn "Come Thou Fount of Every Blessing". One such spectator would recall the events of the execution in his journal, observing that Richards appeared calm and collected during the entire ordeal. Richards' final words were said to have been "Jesus be with me now!" Reverend W. Sanford Gee, who presided over the execution, would later tell reporters he hoped Richards' professions of religious salvation were genuine, but allowed that they might not have been. 

At 1:17 p.m. on April 26, 1879, Richards was hanged. The St. Louis Globe-Democrat said it took fifteen minutes for him to die. Richards would be the first person in Nebraska's history to be executed, since its incorporation into the United States in 1867. Shortly after his execution, a photographer was able to capture a photograph of Richards' corpse propped inside a coffin.

Aftermath
Local doctors hounded Richards before his execution, asking him to consent to donating his body, so they could perform an autopsy. He refused, and would be buried in Minden. Despite his gravesite being guarded, his corpse was stolen the night after his execution—The Sedalia Weekly Bazoo suspected the doctors who had wanted to examine him—but was returned to its resting place shortly thereafter. Sometime later, his body was dug up once again; this time, Richards' bones were scattered on the streets of Kearney. On November 1, 1882, it was reported that Kearney County Gazette had obtained Richards' skull and placed it on display in the newspaper's office window. The current location of Richards' skull and remains is unknown.

Pathology

After his arrest, many people described Richards as charismatic, and noted that he successfully concealed his dark nature under a polite, articulate, and handsome exterior; a friend who accompanied Richards' autobiographer to his interviews said during one visit that Richards did not have the look of a murderer. Contemporary observers remarked that Richards seemed to feel no guilt whatsoever about his crimes. Numerous times between his arrest and his execution, Richards was asked why he had no empathy towards his victims or remorse for his crimes. Sometimes he simply refused to answer. When he did choose to reply to this question, he gave conflicting responses. He would usually cite his associations with people of questionable morals, and his time working at the Mount Pleasant Asylum, as deleterious influences. When The Nebraska State Journal questioned him about his lack of remorse for the heinous murders he had committed, particularly those of the Harlson family, Richards recounted an event from his childhood. He had been tasked to kill a litter of kittens, and did so by bashing each of their heads against a tree. After he had killed all the kittens, he found that he felt no guilt about it, and in fact found the killing "fun". Although some outlets, including modern-day author Michael Newton would classify Richards as a "thrill killer", in interviews with the press Richards would adamantly deny that he enjoyed inflicting pain upon others; claiming that in his younger years other people had considered him to be kind. Reporters who interviewed him after his arrest were often struck by his calm and collected behavior; an article in the New York Daily Herald described him as being "carefree and cheerful". In an interview for the Wheeling Daily Intelligencer, Richards said he knew he would be executed for his crimes, but that he was unafraid of death and was "ready to meet it". When the jury sentenced him to death, he was said to have been unconcerned and in good spirits. The St. Louis Globe-Democrat (which doubted that he had actually committed nine murders) reported that Richards broke down during his final moments, but this was contradicted by other newspaper accounts of his execution. 

Criminal psychology and profiling would not be used as an investigative technique until the Jack the Ripper murders in 1888, nine years after Richards' execution, in 2018, forensic psychologist Katherine Ramsland referred to Richards as "The Old West’s Ted Bundy". Both Richards and Bundy used their charisma to manipulate others, and both displayed a complete lack of remorse for their crimes. Ramsland also pointed out differences between the two serial killers, noting that Bundy murdered for the purpose of sexual gratification, whereas Richards had no preferred method of killing or type of victim; furthermore, Bundy fought his execution, while Richards was indifferent to his death sentence. Ramsland also pointed out a possible reason for his violent behavior, citing a severe head injury that he received shortly before the killings started. Richards himself would briefly mention this injury to the Sedalia Weekly Bazoo, claiming that he received the injury while traveling with several companions in the spring of 1877. When pressed about the circumstances that led to the injury, Richards adamantly refused to divulge additional details on the incident.

Throughout his travels, Richards used various aliases. In an account of his life published in The Sedalia Weekly Bazoo, Richards would admit to having used the false names George Gallagher, F.A. Hoge, and William Hudson. Richards also admitted to corresponding with various acquaintances under the names D.J. Roberts, J. Littleton, and W. A. Littleton.

Legacy
At the time of Richards' arrest and execution, it was a popular belief that all criminals were of poor quality and limited education. Richards would gain brief notoriety after his capture as he did not fit with the public's preconception of criminals, with reporters and members of the public often struck by his charisma, good looks, his education, and outspokenness. Richards was featured in a handful of books and periodicals, the first of these was The Philosophy of Insanity: Richard, the Nebraska Fiend by Dr. John Sanderson Christianson, published on February 9, 1879. A Nebraska State Journal interview with Richards prior to his execution was published in a trail pamphlet titled Life and Confession of Stephen Dee Richards, the Murderer of Nine Persons Executed at Minden, Nebraska, April 26, 1879. The pamphlet, published on May 1, 1879, five days after Richards' hanging, includes entries on other contemporary criminal cases as well. After his execution, interest in Richards dwindled and he would subsequently fade from public memory.

In modern times, Richards is now acknowledged as Nebraska's first documented serial killer. NET Nebraska's documentary Until He Is Dead: A History Of Nebraska's Death Penalty, featured Richards as a prime example of the public spectacle of the state's early executions; the documentary would mistakenly refer to him under his "Samuel Richards" alias. An episode of the SyFy Channel documentary series Paranormal Witness, titled "The Nebraska Fiend", features a family who is purportedly being tormented by Richards' spirit, with an unnamed actor portraying Richards. In the 2018 video game Red Dead Redemption 2 features the character Edmund Lowry Jr. who was partially based on Richards. Richards was featured in the 2021 novel The Scarlet Pen written by Jennifer Uhlarikand, as a part of the historical crime series True Colors. The novel is a fictionalized version of Richards' interaction with his fiancée, whom he regularly sent letters to when he was abroad.

Notes

See also
Axe murder

List of serial killers before 1900

List of people executed in Nebraska

List of serial killers in the United States

References

Sources

Books

Periodicals

Further reading

1854 births
1876 murders in the United States 
1877 murders in the United States 
1878 murders in the United States 
1879 deaths
19th-century American criminals
19th-century executions of American people
American male criminals
American mass murderers
American murderers of children
American people convicted of murder
Axe murder
Executed American serial killers
Executed mass murderers
Family murders
Fugitives wanted by the United States
Male serial killers
Murder in Nebraska
Outlaws of the American Old West
People convicted of murder by Nebraska
People executed by Nebraska by hanging
People from Mount Pleasant, Ohio
People from Nebraska
People from Wheeling, West Virginia
Publicly executed people
Uxoricides